In computer networking, Cisco ASA 5500 Series Adaptive Security Appliances, or simply Cisco ASA, is Cisco's line of network security devices introduced in May 2005. It succeeded three existing lines of popular Cisco products:
 Cisco PIX, which provided firewall and network address translation (NAT) functions, ended its sale on July 28, 2008.
 Cisco's IPS 4200 Series worked as intrusion prevention systems (IPS).
 Cisco VPN 3000 Series Concentrators, which provided virtual private networking (VPN).

The Cisco ASA is a unified threat management device, combining several network security functions in one box.

Reception and criticism 

Cisco ASA has become one of the most widely used firewall/VPN solutions for small to medium businesses. Early reviews indicated the Cisco GUI tools for managing the device were lacking.

A security flaw was identified when users customized the Clientless SSL VPN option of their ASA's but was rectified in 2015.
Another flaw in a WebVPN feature was fixed in 2018.

In 2017 The Shadow Brokers revealed the existence of two privilege escalation exploits against the ASA called EPICBANANA and EXTRABACON. A code insertion implant called BANANAGLEE,  was made persistent by JETPLOW.

Features
The 5506W-X has a WiFi point included.

Architecture
The ASA software is based on Linux. It runs a single Executable and Linkable Format program called lina.  This schedules processes internally rather than using the Linux facilities. In the boot sequence a boot loader called ROMMON (ROM monitor) starts, loads a Linux kernel, which then loads the lina_monitor, which then loads lina. The ROMMON also has a command line that can be used to load or select other software images and configurations. The names of firmware files includes a version indicator, -smp means it is for a symmetrical multiprocessor (and 64 bit architecture), and different parts also indicate if 3DES or AES is supported or not.

The ASA software has a similar interface to the Cisco IOS software on routers. There is a command line interface (CLI) that can be used to query operate or configure the device. In config mode the configuration statements are entered. The configuration is initially in memory as a running-config but would normally be saved to flash memory.

Options
The 5512-X, 5515-X, 5525-X, 5545-X and 5555-X can have an extra interface card added.

The 5585-X has options for SSP. SSP stands for security services processor. These range in processing power by a factor of 10, from SSP-10 SSP-20, SSP-40 and SSP-60. The ASA 5585-X has a slot for an I/O module.  This slot can be subdivided into two half width modules.

On the low end models, some features are limited, and uncrippling happens with installation of a Security Plus License.  This enables more VLANs, or VPN peers, and also high availability. Cisco AnyConnect is an extra licensable feature which operates IPSec or SSL tunnels to clients on PCs, iPhones or iPads.

Models 
The 5505 introduced in 2010 was a desktop unit designed for small enterprises or branch offices. It included features to reduce the need for other equipment, such as an inbuilt switch, and power over Ethernet ports.
The 5585-X is a higher powered unit for datacenters introduced in 2010. It runs in 32 bit mode on an Intel architecture Atom chip.

Cisco determined that most of the low end devices had too little capacity to include the features needed, such as anti-virus, or sandboxing, and so introduced a new line called next generation firewall. These run in 64 bit mode.

Models as of 2018.

References

External links 
 Cisco ASA 5500 Series Adaptive Security Appliances
 Cisco TAC Security Podcast - ASA troubleshooting information

Server appliance
Lua (programming language)-scriptable hardware
Cisco products
Computer network security